Vera Joan Maynard (5 July 1921 – 27 March 1998) was an English Labour politician and trade unionist.

Biography 
Maynard was born in Easingwold, North Yorkshire on 5 July 1921. Dubbed "Stalin's Granny" owing to her left-wing views, Maynard was a leading activist in the National Union of Agricultural Workers becoming vice-president of the union and being narrowly beaten to its presidency. She joined the Labour Party in 1946 and served as a councillor on the North Riding County Council. She was elected to Labour's National Executive Committee 1972–82 and 1983–87, and was Vice-Chair of the Labour Party 1980–81. She was appointed a Justice of the Peace at Thirsk in 1950.

Having acted as Labour agent in Thirsk, North Yorkshire, Maynard was elected in 1974 as MP for Sheffield Brightside and held the seat until she retired in 1987. Throughout her political career Maynard advocated policies on the left of the Labour Party and chaired the left-wing Campaign Group. She served on the Agriculture Select Committee 1975–87. She played a leading role in securing the passage of the Rent (Agriculture) Act 1976 which put an end to the iniquitous tied cottage system that caused so much misery to rural workers and their families .

Jeremy Corbyn MP, Leader of the Labour Party from 2015 to 2020, said that Maynard became a 'great friend' to him when he first joined the House of Commons in 1983. He recounted that Maynard had told him that "If both front benches are agreed, it’s probably bad news for the workers. And if a minister ever gets up and says ‘we’re going to have to take some tough choices and some tough decisions,’ it's a disaster for the working class. Just bear that in mind and you'll not go far wrong."

Maynard died of cancer in Sowerby, North Yorkshire on 27 March 1998, the same day as fellow former MP, Joan Lestor. Her remains are buried alongside her immediate family at Thornton-le-Street.

Bibliography
Mason-O'Connor, Kristine (2003). Joan Maynard: A Passionate Socialist. Politico's Publishing. 
Routledge, Paul (2003). Bumper Book of British Lefties. Politico's Publishing.

References

External links 
 

1921 births
1998 deaths
Female members of the Parliament of the United Kingdom for English constituencies
Members of North Riding County Council
Labour Party (UK) MPs for English constituencies
National Union of Agricultural and Allied Workers-sponsored MPs
UK MPs 1974–1979
UK MPs 1979–1983
UK MPs 1983–1987
20th-century British women politicians
20th-century English women
20th-century English people
Women councillors in England